This is a list of Category A listed buildings in the Western Isles of Scotland.

In Scotland, the term listed building refers to a building or other structure officially designated as being of "special architectural or historic interest".  Category A structures are those considered to be "buildings of national or international importance, either architectural or historic, or fine little-altered examples of some particular period, style or building type." Listing was begun by a provision in the Town and Country Planning (Scotland) Act 1947, and the current legislative basis for listing is the Planning (Listed Buildings and Conservation Areas) (Scotland) Act 1997.  The authority for listing rests with Historic Scotland, an executive agency of the Scottish Government, which inherited this role from the Scottish Development Department in 1991. Once listed, severe restrictions are imposed on the modifications allowed to a building's structure or its fittings. Listed building consent must be obtained from local authorities prior to any alteration to such a structure. There are approximately 47,400 listed buildings in Scotland, of which around 8% (or approximately 3,800) are Category A.

The council area of Na h-Eileanan Siar (Western Isles) comprises an archipelago of over 100 islands and small skerries, including 14 inhabited islands with a total population of around 26,500. There are 18 Category A listed buildings on the islands, representing a variety of types and ages of structure. The 13th-century Church of St Moluag is one of three A-listed church buildings. Kisimul Castle, built on a tiny island off the shore of Castlebay, dates from the 15th century, while the two other A-listed castles at Amhuinnsuidhe and Lews are Victorian. Functional architecture includes three important lighthouses, including Eilean Glas, the first lighthouse in the Western Isles. More prosaic building types are well represented, with eight traditional thatched cottages meriting Category A listing.

Listed buildings 

|}

Notes

References

External links

Western Isles